Michael Douglas Aron (born 22 March 1959) is a British diplomat who has been Ambassador to Kuwait, Iraq, Libya and Sudan, and Yemen.

Career
Aron was educated at Exeter School, Leeds University and the Polytechnic of Central London. He taught English in Sudan before joining the Foreign and Commonwealth Office (FCO) in 1984. He has served at New York, Brasilia and Brussels. He was Ambassador to Kuwait 2008–09, Head of the Middle East Department at the FCO 2010–11, Ambassador to Iraq 2011–12, acting Head of Mission at Tripoli September 2012 to January 2013, and Ambassador to Libya from January 2013 until June 2015.

After the outbreak of the Libyan Civil War in 2014, Aron supervised the evacuation of British citizens from Tripoli on the Royal Navy survey ship HMS Enterprise. He and his remaining staff then closed the embassy and left Libya to set up a temporary office in Tunis.

In April 2015, Aron was appointed Ambassador to the Republic of Sudan, and took up the appointment in August of that year. In February 2018 he was transferred at short notice to be Ambassador to Yemen.

Family
Aron was married to Rachel (née Barker) who was also a diplomat, now retired after being British Ambassador to Belgium from 2007 to 2010. They have two sons and two daughters. They divorced in 2016.

References

1959 births
Living people
People educated at Exeter School
Alumni of the University of Leeds
Alumni of the University of Westminster
Members of HM Diplomatic Service
Ambassadors of the United Kingdom to Kuwait
Ambassadors of the United Kingdom to Iraq
Ambassadors of the United Kingdom to Libya
Ambassadors of the United Kingdom to Sudan
Ambassadors of the United Kingdom to Yemen
20th-century British diplomats